Grosvenor is a surname derived from Hugh Le Grand Veneur, a member of a Norman French family that aided William the Conqueror in 1066. "Le Grand Veneur" literally means "the Master Huntsman" in French, an elevated title in William's 11th-century French court. Initially, Hugh was called Hugh Lupus. Lupus was overweight, and his townsmen gradually changed the appellation from "Le Grand Veneur", "the Master Huntsman," to "Le Gros Veneur", "the Fat Huntsman", and Hugh wore the epithet with pride.

People
Bendor Grosvenor (born 1977), British art dealer and art historian
Catherine Grosvenor (born 1978), a British playwright and translator
Ebenezer O. Grosvenor (1820–1910), an American politician from Michigan
Luther Grosvenor (born 1946), a British rock musician
Thomas Peabody Grosvenor (1744–1825), a United States Representative from New York
Vertamae Grosvenor (1938–2016), a food writer and broadcaster
Charles Henry Grosvenor (1833-1917), Representative from Ohio
Benjamin Grosvenor (born 1992), a British classical pianist
Lady Edwina Louise Grosvenor (born 1981), a British prison reformer
Gilbert Hovey Grosvenor (1875–1966), first editor of National Geographic Magazine and president of the National Geographic Society
Melville Bell Grosvenor (1901–1982), editor of National Geographic Magazine and president of the National Geographic Society, son of Gilbert Hovey Grosvenor
Gilbert Melville Grosvenor (born 1931), editor of National Geographic Magazine, son of Melville Bell Grosvenor
Edwin S. Grosvenor (born 1951), publisher of American Heritage, son of Melville Bell Grosvenor and half-brother of Gilbert Melville Grosvenor
Hugh Grosvenor (born 1991), 7th Duke of Westminster

Fictional
Archibald Grosvenor, one of the main characters in the Gilbert & Sullivan opera Patience

References

Surnames of Norman origin